The Gothic style of architecture was strongly influenced by the Romanesque architecture which preceded it;  by the growing population and wealth of European cities,  and by the desire to express grandeur. It was also influenced by theological doctrines which called for more interior light as a symbol of divinity, and by the practical necessity of many churches to accommodate large numbers of pilgrims.  It was especially by technical improvements in vaulting and buttresses which allowed much greater height and larger windows.

Political 
At the end of the 12th century, Europe was divided into a multitude of city states and kingdoms. The area encompassing modern Germany, southern Denmark, the Netherlands, Belgium, Luxembourg, Switzerland, Austria, Czech Republic and much of northern Italy (excluding Venice and Papal States) was nominally part of the Holy Roman Empire, but local rulers exercised considerable autonomy. France, Denmark, Poland, Hungary, Portugal, Scotland, Castile, Aragon, Navarre, and Cyprus were independent kingdoms, as was the Angevin Empire, whose Plantagenet kings ruled England and large domains in what was to become modern France. Norway came under the influence of England, while the other Scandinavian countries and Poland were influenced by trading contacts with the Hanseatic League. Swabian kings brought the Gothic tradition from Germany to Southern Italy, part of the Norman Kingdom of Sicily, while after the First Crusade the Lusignan kings introduced French Gothic architecture to Cyprus and the Kingdom of Jerusalem.

Throughout Europe at this time there was a rapid growth in trade and an associated growth in towns. Germany and the Lowlands had large flourishing towns that grew in comparative peace, in trade and competition with each other, or united for mutual weal, as in the Hanseatic League. Civic building was of great importance to these towns as a sign of wealth and pride. England and France remained largely feudal and produced grand domestic architecture for their kings, dukes and bishops, rather than grand town halls for their burghers.

Religious 
The Roman Catholic Church prevailed across Western Europe at this time, influencing not only faith but also wealth and power. Bishops were appointed by the feudal lords (kings, dukes and other landowners) and they often ruled as virtual princes over large estates. The early mediaeval periods had seen a rapid growth in monasticism, with several different orders being prevalent and spreading their influence widely. Foremost were the Benedictines whose great abbey churches vastly outnumbered any others in France, Normandy and England. A part of their influence was that towns developed around them and they became centres of culture, learning and commerce. They were the builders of the Abbey of Saint-Denis, and Abbey of Saint-Remi in France. Later Benedictine projects (constructions and renovations) include Rouen's Abbey of Saint-Ouen, the Abbey La Chaise-Dieu, and the choir of Mont Saint-Michel in France. English examples are Westminster Abbey, originally built as a Benedictine order monastic church; and the reconstruction of the Benedictine church at Canterbury.

The Cluniac and Cistercian Orders were prevalent in France, the great monastery at Cluny having established a formula for a well planned monastic site which was then to influence all subsequent monastic building for many centuries. The Cistercians spread the style as far east and south as Poland and Hungary. Smaller orders such as the Carthusians and Premonstratensians also built some 200 churches, usually near cities.

In the 13th century Francis of Assisi established the Franciscans, or so-called "Grey Friars", a mendicant order. Saint Dominic founded the mendicant Dominicans, in Toulouse and Bologna, were particularly influential in the building of Italy's Gothic churches.

The Teutonic Order, a military order, spread Gothic art into Pomerania, East Prussia, and the Baltic region.

Geographic 
From the 10th to the 13th century, Romanesque architecture had become a pan-European style and manner of construction, affecting buildings in countries as far apart as Ireland, Croatia, Sweden and Sicily. The same wide geographic area was then affected by the development of Gothic architecture, but the acceptance of the Gothic style and methods of construction differed from place to place, as did the expressions of Gothic taste. The proximity of some regions meant that modern country borders do not define divisions of style. On the other hand, some regions such as England and Spain produced defining characteristics rarely seen elsewhere, except where they have been carried by itinerant craftsmen, or the transfer of bishops. Regional differences that are apparent in the churches of the Romanesque period often become even more apparent in the Gothic.

The local availability of materials affected both construction and style. In France, limestone was readily available in several grades, the very fine white limestone of Caen being favoured for sculptural decoration. England had coarse limestone and red sandstone as well as dark green Purbeck marble which was often used for architectural features.

In Northern Germany, Netherlands, northern Poland, Denmark, and the Baltic countries local building stone was unavailable but there was a strong tradition of building in brick. The resultant style, Brick Gothic, is called "Backsteingotik" in Germany and Scandinavia and is associated with the Hanseatic League. In Italy, stone was used for fortifications, but brick was preferred for other buildings. Because of the extensive and varied deposits of marble, many buildings were faced in marble, or were left with undecorated façade so that this might be achieved at a later date.

The availability of timber also influenced the style of architecture, with timber buildings prevailing in Scandinavia. Availability of timber affected methods of roof construction across Europe. It is thought that the magnificent hammer-beam roofs of England were devised as a direct response to the lack of long straight seasoned timber by the end of the mediaeval period, when forests had been decimated not only for the construction of vast roofs but also for ship building.

Romanesque tradition 

Gothic architecture grew out of the previous architectural genre, Romanesque. For the most part, there was not a clean break, as there was to be later in Renaissance Florence with the revival of the Classical style in the early 15th century.

By the 12th century, builders throughout Europe developed Romanesque architectural styles (termed Norman architecture in England because of its association with the Norman Conquest). Scholars have focused on categories of Romanesque/Norman building, including the cathedral church, the parish church, the abbey church, the monastery, the castle, the palace, the great hall, the gatehouse, the civic building, the warehouse, and others.

Many architectural features that are associated with Gothic architecture had been developed and used by the architects of Romanesque buildings, particularly in the building of cathedrals and abbey churches. These include ribbed vaults, buttresses, clustered columns, ambulatories, wheel windows, spires, stained glass windows, and richly carved door tympana. These were already features of ecclesiastical architecture before the development of the Gothic style, and all were to develop in increasingly elaborate ways.

It was principally the development of the pointed arch which brought about the change that separates Gothic from Romanesque. This technological change broke the tradition of massive masonry and solid walls penetrated by small openings, replacing it with a style where light appears to triumph over substance. With its use came the development of many other architectural devices, previously put to the test in scattered buildings and then called into service to meet the structural, aesthetic and ideological needs of the new style. These include the flying buttresses, pinnacles and traceried windows.

Eastern Christian, Sasanian, and Islamic Architecture 
The pointed arch, one of the defining attributes of Gothic, appears in Late Roman Byzantine architecture and the Sasanian architecture of Iran during late antiquity, although the form had been used earlier, as in the possibly 1st century AD Temple of Bel, Dura Europos in Roman Mesopotamia. In the Roman context it occurred in church buildings in Syria and occasional secular structures, like the Karamagara Bridge in modern Turkey. In Sassanid architecture parabolic and pointed arches were employed in both palace and sacred construction. A very slightly pointed arch built in 549 exists in the apse of the Basilica of Sant'Apollinare in Classe in Ravenna, and slightly more pointed example from a church, built 564 at Qasr Ibn Wardan in Roman Syria. Pointed arches' development may have been influenced by the elliptical and parabolic arches frequently employed in Sasanian buildings using pitched brick vaulting, which obviated any need for wooden centring and which had for millennia been used in Mesopotamia and Syria. The oldest pointed arches in Islamic architecture are in the Dome of the Rock, completed in 691/2, while some others appear in the Great Mosque of Damascus, begun in 705. The Umayyads were responsible for the oldest significantly pointed arches in medieval western Europe, employing them alongside horseshoe arches in the Great Mosque of Cordoba, built from 785 and repeatedly extended. The Abbasid palace at al-Ukhaidir employed pointed arches in 778 as a dominant theme both structural and decorative throughout the façades and vaults of the complex, while the tomb of al-Muntasir, built 862, employed a dome with a pointed arch profile. Abbasid Samarra had many pointed arches, notably its surviving Bab al-ʿAmma (monumental triple gateway). By the 9th century the pointed arch was used in Egypt and North Africa: in the Nilometer at Fustat in 861, the 876 Mosque of Ibn Tulun in Cairo, and the 870s Great Mosque of Kairouan. Through the 8th and 9th centuries, the pointed arch was employed as standard in secular buildings in architecture throughout the Islamic world. The 10th century Aljafería at Zaragoza displays numerous forms of arch, including many pointed arches decorated and elaborated to a level of design sophistication not seen in Gothic architecture for a further two centuries.

Increasing military and cultural contacts with the Muslim world, including the Norman conquest of Islamic Sicily between 1060 and 1090, the Crusades, beginning 1096, and the Islamic presence in Spain, may have influenced medieval Europe's adoption of the pointed arch, although this hypothesis remains controversial. The structural advantages of pointed arches seems first to have been realised in a medieval Latin Christian context at the abbey church known as Cluny III at Cluny Abbey. Begun by abbot Hugh of Cluny in 1089, the great Romanesque church of Cluny III was the largest church in the west when completed in 1130. Kenneth John Conant, who excavated the site of the church's ruins, argued that the architectural innovations of Cluny III were inspired by the Islamic architecture of Sicily via Monte Cassino. The Abbey of Monte Cassino was the foundational community of the Benedictine Order and lay within the Norman Kingdom of Sicily, . The rib vault with pointed arches was used at Lessay Abbey in Normandy in 1098, and at Durham Cathedral in England at about the same time. In those parts of the Western Mediterranean subject to Islamic control or influence, rich regional variants arose, fusing Romanesque, Byzantine and later Gothic traditions with Islamic decorative forms, as seen, for example, in Monreale and Cefalù Cathedrals, the Alcázar of Seville, and Teruel Cathedral.

Notes

Citations

Bibliography

 
 
 
 
 
 Clark, W. W.; King, R. (1983). Laon Cathedral, Architecture. Courtauld Institute Illustration Archives. 1. London: Harvey Miller Publishers. .
 
 
 
 
 
 
 
 
 
 
 
 
 
 
 
 
 
 
 
 
 
 
 
 
 
 
 
 
 
 
 
 
 
 
 
 
 
 

 
Architectural history
Architectural styles
European architecture

Architecture in England
Architecture in Italy
Medieval French architecture
Catholic architecture
12th-century architecture
13th-century architecture
14th-century architecture
15th-century architecture
16th-century architecture